Sun Dong-yol (or  ; born January 10, 1963) is a South Korean retired baseball pitcher and former manager. He was a pitcher in the KBO League and Nippon Professional Baseball, and the former manager of the Samsung Lions and the Kia Tigers in the KBO.

Sun is one of the most celebrated pitchers in the history of the KBO League. He was voted Most Valuable Player of the league three times, won the Pitching Triple Crown four times, was awarded six Golden Gloves, and was a nine-time KBO All-Star. Sun holds the record for lowest Korea Professional Baseball career ERA, at 1.20, is third all-time in strikeouts, and recorded the top three lowest single-season ERAs in KBO League history. His teams won six Korean Series titles, and his uniform #18 was retired by the Kia Tigers.

Amateur career 
Upon graduation from Gwangju Jeil High School, Sun joined the Korea University baseball team in 1981.

In , Sun competed for the South Korea national junior baseball team in the inaugural World Junior Baseball Championship. He tossed a six-hit complete game with 11 strikeouts in a 3-1 win over United States in Game 1 of the final. South Korea eventually won the inaugural championship by defeating USA 3–2 in Game 2 as well, and Sun shared the MVP Award with Team USA ace Todd Burns.

In , Sun was called up to the South Korea national baseball team for the 1982 Baseball World Cup hosted by South Korea. He led Team Korea to its first champion in the event, posting a 0.31 ERA in 29.0 innings pitched and racking up 3 complete game wins. In South Korea's second game, Sun started against future MLB star Bill Swift in a matchup of pitchers and notched a five-hit complete game victory over Team USA, allowing only one run and posting 15 strikeouts. In South Korea's final game, he threw a complete game once again in a 5–2 win over Japan. He was eventually named the MVP and selected to the All-Star team as the best right-handed pitcher.

In the 1983 Intercontinental Cup, Sun was named Best Pitcher, going 3–0 including two complete game shutout wins.

In August 1984, Sun competed for the South Korea national team in the 1984 Los Angeles Summer Olympics, where they finished 4th in the baseball tournament. He was 1–1 with a 0.56 ERA and 10 strikeouts, allowing only one earned run in 16 innings pitched.

In October 1984, Sun competed in the Baseball World Cup again. He was 1–1 with a 0.00 ERA and 20 strikeouts in 17.1 innings pitched, and eventually won the ERA title.

Notable international careers

Professional career

KBO League

Haitai Tigers 

Signed by the Haitai Tigers, Sun made his debut in the KBO league against the Samsung Lions in Daegu on July 2, 1985. In his inaugural year, he finished with a 7−4 record, a 1.70 ERA, and 103 strikeouts. That season Sun failed to win the Rookie of the Year award, but won the first of seven consecutive ERA titles as a rookie.

In 1986, Sun dominated the league with a record of 24−6 and an ERA of 0.99 with 214 strikeouts in 262.2 innings pitched, and became the second KBO pitcher to win the Pitching Triple Crown (Park Chul-soon won the first one, in 1983).

In 1987, Sun was 14−2 with a 0.89 ERA and 144 strikeouts, and won the ERA title again and finished 2nd in wins and 3rd in strikeouts. He has pitched one of the finest games of his career in this season: On May 16, in a 2-2 game against the Lotte Giants, Sun completed a game of no-decision through 15 innings – he pitched 232 pitches in total. The opposing pitcher Choi Dong-won, also regarded as one of the finest in the league, also completed the game, ending up pitching 209 pitches. This matchup of the two Korean ace pitchers is often considered as one of the best moments in Korean baseball history.

In 1988, Sun was 16−5, notching 200 strikeouts and a 1.21 ERA, and won the ERA and strikeout titles.

In 1989, Sun finished the year by winning his second Pitching Triple Crown, leading the league in wins (21), ERA (1.17) and strikeouts (198). On July 6, 1989, he recorded the fifth no-hitter in a complete game shut-out in the KBO history against the Samsung Lions.

In 1990, Sun won his third Pitching Triple Crown, going 22−6 with a 1.13 ERA and 189 strikeouts, allowing only one home run in 190.1 innings pitched.

In 1991, Sun grabbed the fourth of Pitching Triple Crowns with a 19−4 record, a 1.55 ERA, and 210 strikeouts.

During the 1992 season, Sun was on the disabled list for several months. Meanwhile, Tigers' manager Kim Eung-ryong intended to use him as a long reliever or closer, and Sun was eventually moved into the closer's role as he came back from injury. In 1992, he saved 8 games and compiled a 0.28 ERA in 32.2 innings pitched.

In 1993, his first full season as a relief pitcher, Sun finished with a 10−3 record, a league-leading 31 saves, and 164 strikeouts in 126.1 innings pitched. Though it is very rare for a reliever to get enough innings, he became the first closer relief pitcher to win the ERA title with a 0.78 ERA, pitching more than the required innings to qualify for the title.

In 1994, he had the only mediocre season of his KBO career. He saved only 12 games with a 6-4 record and 94 strikeouts in 102.1 innings pitched, and his 2.73 ERA was the highest of his career.

However, Sun came back strong in 1995, leading the KBO league with 33 saves and recording a 0.49 ERA in 109.1 innings pitched.

Nippon Professional Baseball

Chunichi Dragons 
After the 1995 KBO season, Sun announced that he would leave the KBO league for a move to either MLB or NPB. After the announcement, the Chunichi Dragons and Yomiuri Giants in NPB swiftly attempted to acquire him to fill bullpen void. In December 1995, Sun managed to sign a contract with the Chunichi Dragons on a four-year loan deal from the Haitai Tigers.

On April 6, 1996, Sun made his NPB debut against Hiroshima Carp in Nagoya Dome, appearing in the 9th inning during the save situation, but got a blown save. During his inaugural NPB season, Sun struggled to adjust himself to Japanese style of play, and was sent down to the reserve team of the Dragons several times. He finished the worst year of his career with only 3 saves and a 5.50 ERA, never garnering more than mop-up duties.

After the disastrous debut season, Sun performed strongly in the 1997 season. He led the Central League in saves, with 38, posting a 1.28 ERA with 68 strikeouts. During the season, he did not allow any home run in 63.1 innings pitched. Sun also appeared at the 1997 Japan All-Star Game.

Sun continued to dominate the league as an elite closer in 1998, saving 29 games with a 1.48 ERA and 58 strikeouts.

in 1999, Sun notched 28 saves (the league's runner-up) and a 2.61 ERA, and allowed only one home run, appearing in 39 games. As a key member of the Chunichi Dragons, he led his team to their first Central League title since 1988.

After the 1999 season, the Chunichi Dragons attempted to renew the contract with Sun as the contract was expired, but the Dragons didn't reach agreement on the new contract with Sun's former team Haitai Tigers, which required another loan for the contract extension.

Amid controversy, Sun announced retirement on November 22, 1999 after he finally failed to sign with the Dragons.

Meanwhile, the Haitai Tigers in the KBO also planned to set his final game with a ceremony in Gwangju, South Korea. However, Sun decided to play his final game in Nagoya, Japan.

On March 6, 2000, Sun started the Dragons' first 2000 pre-season game against the Yomiuri Giants in Nagoya Dome, and threw two pitches against Hideki Matsui, allowing a single in his final pitch. The game was followed by an elaborate retirement ceremony.

In film
Sun was played by Yang Dong-geun in the film Perfect Game (2011) and Choi Dong-won was played by Cho Seung-woo.

See also 
 List of KBO career win leaders
 List of KBO career strikeout leaders
 List of KBO career saves leaders

References

External links 
 Career statistics and player information from Korea Baseball Organization
 
 

Kia Tigers managers
Samsung Lions managers
South Korean baseball managers
Samsung Lions coaches
Baseball players at the 1984 Summer Olympics
Olympic baseball players of South Korea
Chunichi Dragons players
Haitai Tigers players
South Korean expatriate baseball players in Japan
KBO League Most Valuable Player Award winners
KBO League pitchers
South Korean baseball coaches
South Korean Roman Catholics
Korea University alumni
1963 births
Living people
Baseball players with retired numbers
Boseong Seon clan
Sportspeople from Gwangju